The Hotfoot 27 is a Canadian sailboat that was designed by Doug Hemphill as racer-cruiser and first built in 1981.

Production
The design was built by Hotfoot Boats in Canada, but the company is no longer in business and the boat design is now out of production.

Design
The Hotfoot 27 is a recreational keelboat, built predominantly of fibreglass, with wood trim. It has a fractional sloop rig, a raked stem, a vertical transom, a transom-hung rudder controlled by a tiller and a fixed fin keel. It displaces  and carries  of ballast.

The boat is normally fitted with a small outboard motor for docking and maneuvering. The motor is mounted in the starboard lazarette and can be swung up when not in use and the hull opening covered with a hatch.

The boat's galley is located on the starboard side. It includes a sink and a single-burner alcohol stove, which both slide under the cockpit for stowage. The head is a chemical type and is located forward, just aft of the bow "V"-berth, forward of the bulkhead. Additional sleeping space is provided in the cabin, with two berths. A chart table is located on the port side and also stows under the cockpit when not in use.

Standard equipment includes a spinnaker and associated gear, an outboard motor bracket, headfoil (a headsail airfoil-shaped reinforcement) and a compass. The boat's controls all can be actuated from the cockpit and include internally-mounted halyards. The cockpit has two genoa winches and two winches for the halyards. There is a 4:1 internal outhaul, an 8:1 boom vang and adjustable backstay and running backstays.

The design has a PHRF racing average handicap of 147 with a high of 152 and low of 138.

Operational history
In a review Richard Sherwood wrote, "the Hotfoot is a new design that is selling well in Victoria, B.C., and starting to move south. Keel and rudder are both deep to assist to windward, often a problem with boats this light. The running backstays are unusual. The manufacturers feel that they are needed for shaping the sail, not for keeping the rig up."

See also
List of sailing boat types

Similar sailboats
Aloha 27
Cal 27
Cal 2-27
Cal 3-27
Catalina 27
Catalina 270
Catalina 275 Sport
C&C 27
Crown 28
CS 27
Edel 820
Express 27
Fantasia 27
Halman Horizon
Hullmaster 27
Hunter 27
Hunter 27-2
Hunter 27-3
Irwin 27 
Island Packet 27
Mirage 27 (Schmidt)
Mirage 27 (Perry)
Mirage 275
O'Day 272
Orion 27-2
Watkins 27
Watkins 27P

References

Keelboats
1980s sailboat type designs
Sailing yachts
Sailboat type designs by Doug Hemphill
Sailboat types built by Hotfoot Boats